Henri Cochet defeated Jean Borotra 6–4, 6–3, 6–4 in the final to win the gentlemen's singles tennis title at the 1929 Wimbledon Championships. René Lacoste was the defending champion, but did not participate.

Seeds

  Henri Cochet (champion)
  Jean Borotra (final)
  Bill Tilden (semifinals)
  Frank Hunter (second round)
  Uberto de Morpurgo (third round)
  George Lott (quarterfinals)
  Béla von Kehrling (quarterfinals)
  Colin Gregory (fourth round)

Draw

Finals

Top half

Section 1

Section 2

Section 3

Section 4

Bottom half

Section 5

Section 6

Section 7

Section 8

References

External links

Men's Singles
Wimbledon Championship by year – Men's singles